Tingay is a surname. Notable people with the surname include:

 Declan Tingay (born 1999), Australian racewalking athlete
 Lance Tingay (1915–1990), British sports journalist, historian, and author
 Steven Tingay, Australian astronomer
 Stephen Tingay (born 1970), Australian rules footballer